The Frío River is a river in Barranquitas and Comerío, Puerto Rico.

See also

 List of rivers of Puerto Rico

References

External links
 USGS Hydrologic Unit Map – Caribbean Region (1974)
 Ríos de Puerto Rico 

Rivers of Puerto Rico